Đeletovci is a village in the municipality of Nijemci within the Vukovar-Syrmia County, Croatia. It had a population of 511 people in the 2011 census.
The village is located on the Zagreb-Belgrade Railway and the D57 road.

The village is best known for oil and natural gas fields located in the vicinity owned by INA. The village is inhabited mostly Catholic Croats.

Name
The name of the village in Croatian is plural.

History
Đeletovci was occupied by Yugoslavian army and by Republic of Serb Krajina forces on October 1, 1991. The village was integrated into the rebel Republic of Serb Krajina during the Yugoslav Wars. The Scorpions paramilitary controlled the village during the war and remained there until 1996 when the United Nations Transitional Administration for Eastern Slavonia, Baranja and Western Sirmium took control of the area. In 1998, the area was reintegrated into the Republic of Croatia. 
During the war, Serb forces evicted 900 inhabitants of the village. By 2011 there were 511 people in the village.

Culture
The village has a cultural association KUD Grančica. The association was founded in 1965.

See also
Đeletovci railway station

References

Populated places in Vukovar-Syrmia County
Populated places in Syrmia